To Violate the Oblivious is a 2004 album by the American one-man black metal act Xasthur. After the original release on Swedish Total Holocaust Records, a re-mastered US pressing was released on Moribund Records in 2005 (featuring one bonus track). The same year, a limited double-vinyl edition was released on German label Perverted Taste (with yet another bonus track). The name of this album is misspelt on Spotify as "To Violate the Obvious".

Track listing

Track four is misspelt in the Spotify version as "Screaming at Forgotten Tears".

External links
 album page on Xasthur's official website
 album page on Encyclopaedia Metallum
 Original edition, US edition and Double-vinyl edition on discogs.com

2004 albums
Xasthur albums